Sphaerium is a genus of very small freshwater clams, aquatic bivalve molluscs in the family Sphaeriidae, known as the fingernail clams. The small clams in this genus are unusual in that many of them, such as Sphaerium corneum, can climb around underwater on aquatic plants, using their long and strong foot.

Species
 Subgenus Sphaerium Scopoli, 1777

Sphaerium corneum (Linnaeus, 1758) – European fingernail clam
 Subgenus Nucleocyclas Alimov & Starobogatov, 1968
 Sphaerium nucleus (Studer, 1820)
 Sphaerium ovale (A. Férussac, 1807)
 Subgenus Parasphaerium Alimov & Starobogatov, 1968

Sphaerium nitidum Clessin, 1876 – Arctic fingernail clam
 Subgenus Amesoda Rafinesque, 1820
 Sphaerium rivicola (Lamarck, 1818)
 Subgenus Cyrenastrum Bourguignat, 1854
 Sphaerium solidum (Normand, 1844)
 Without subgenus

Sphaerium asiaticum (Martens, 1864)
 Sphaerium bequaerti (Dautzenberg & Germain, 1914) – data deficient (DD)
 Sphaerium cornuta
 Sphaerium novaezelandiae Deshayes, 1854
 Sphaerium rhomboideum (Say, 1822)
 Sphaerium stuhlmanni Martens, 1897 – least concern (LC)
 Extinct
 Sphaerium beckmani Russell, 1976
 Sphaerium florissantense Cockerell, 1906

References

External links
 Sphaerium Scopoli, 1777 on Biolib
 Pelecypoda (Clams) on Aquatic Invertebrates of Alberta 
 

 
Taxa named by Giovanni Antonio Scopoli
Bivalve genera